The 2009 KBS Drama Awards is a ceremony honoring the outstanding achievement in television on the Korean Broadcasting System (KBS) network for the year of 2009. It was held on December 31, 2009 and hosted by Tak Jae-hoon, Lee Da-hae and Kim So-yeon.

Nominations and winners

References

External links
http://www.kbs.co.kr/drama/2009award/

KBS Drama Awards
KBS Drama Awards
KBS Drama Awards
KBS Drama Awards